The Pop Years is a British television show that reviewed pop music of a certain year from 1980 to 1999. It was first shown on Sky1 in 2003 and was later repeated on Sky3. The programme featured archive clips relating to the particular year that it was reviewing, e.g. music videos or live performances. It also featured interviews with famous singers from that year and talking heads who enjoyed that year's music. The show ran for a single series of 20 episodes and was narrated by Scott Mills and Edith Bowman.

Pundits
The Pop Years contained interviews with many celebrities, who acted as pundits or talking heads for the show, and discussed various aspects of the year that was being featured. Some of these included:
Alan Carr
Ali Bastian
Andrew Collins
Anthony Wilson
Betty Boo
Brandon Block
Claire Sweeney
Clint Boon
Colin Murray
Darius Campbell
Don Letts
Holly Valance
James Redmond
Jazzie B
Julia Carling
Kate Lawler
Kerry Katona
Limahl
Louis Walsh
Mark Goodier
MC Hammer
Pete Burns
Pete Tong
Pete Waterman
Peter Powell
Sally Lindsay
Shaun Ryder
Simon Cowell
Toby Anstis
Tony Hadley

See also
List of programmes broadcast by Sky1

External links

2000s British music television series
2003 British television series debuts
2003 British television series endings
English-language television shows
Pop music television series
Sky UK original programming
Television series by ITV Studios
London Weekend Television shows